Pikasilla is a village in Tõrva Parish, Valga County, in southern Estonia. It is located west of the end of the Väike-Emajõgi River, before it drains into Lake Võrtsjärv. The Viljandi–Rõngu road crosses the Väike-Emajõgi on a  bridge in Pikasilla, hence the name Pikasilla which literally means "long bridge's". Pikasilla has a population of 92 (as of 1 January 2012).

References

External links
Pikasilla village 
Pikasilla-Purtsi village society 

Villages in Valga County
Tõrva Parish